Monte Pisanino is the highest peak (1,946 m) in the Alpi Apuane, in Tuscany, central Italy. Located in the comune of Minucciano (province of Lucca), it is also the highest mountain entirely belonging to the Tuscany region.

Name 

According to the legend, it takes its name from a Pisan soldier who took refuge here. Locally it is called Pizzo della Caranca.

References 

Mountains of Tuscany
Mountains of the Apennines